Taliabu Island Regency is a regency in the North Maluku province of Indonesia. It was formerly part of the Sula Islands Regency, but in 2013 it was administratively separated to form a separate regency. It is located to the west of Mangole Island and Sanana Island, the two islands which remain part of the Sula Islands Regency. Taliabu (including minor offshore islands) covers 1,587.77 km2; it had a population of 47,309 at the 2010 Census and 58,047 at the 2020 Census.

History
The establishment of the Taliabu Island Regency is intended to encourage the improvement of services in the fields of government, development and society, as well as the ability to utilize regional potentials for the implementation of regional autonomy, so it is necessary to enact a Law on the Establishment of Taliabu Island Regency in North Maluku Province.

The legal basis of this law is Undang-Undang Dasar Negara Republik Indonesia Tahun 1945 Article 18, Article 18A, Article 18B, Article 20 and Article 21; Law Number 46 of 1999; Law Number 1 Year 2003; Law Number 32 of 2004; Law Number 33 of 2004; Law Number 27 Year 2009; Law Number 12 of 2011; Law Number 15 of 2011; and Law Number 8 of 2012.

This Law regulates: The establishment of the Taliabu Island Regency which is a division of the Sula Islands Regency consisting of 8 (eight) administrative districts, namely West Taliabu District, Northwest Taliabu District, Lede District, North Taliabu District, East Taliabu District, South East Taliabu District, South Taliabu District, and Tabona District. Taliabu Island Regency has a total area of 1,587.77 km2 with a population of 58,047 people at the 2020 Census, and includes 71 (seventy-one) villages (desa and kelurahan).

Ethnicity 
The population living on Taliabu Island consists of the Taliabu natives consisting of the Mange tribe, Kadai tribe, Siboyo tribe, and Panto tribe which are classified based on the language used, settled area, and livelihood orientation, etc. Meanwhile, immigrants from outside the island of Taliabu, namely the Butonese, Ambonese, Banggai, Bugis-Makassar and Javanese.

Although the people of Taliabu consist of various tribes with different cultural backgrounds, the social life of the community has never experienced social inequality, let alone social conflict. This is protected by the local wisdom of the people of Taliabu Island, known as Mangkalomu or gather together to solve various problems based on Dadi Sia Kito Mangkoyong yang artinya bersatu untuk maju. which means to unite to move forward. This philosophy of peaceful community life has been used as a motto by the Taliabu Island Regency government with the term Hamungsia Sia Tofu which means Together and United.

Religion 
Based on data from the Central Statistics Agency Taliabu Island district in 2019 it was noted that the religion adopted by the majority of the people in this region is Islam with a percentage of 75.16%. Then, some of them embrace religion Christianism with a percentage of 24.84%, where Protestanism is 18.98% and Catholicism is 5.86%. And a small number of people embrace the Hinduism religion or also the original belief system of the Taliabu community.

Administration 
In 2013 the seven districts (kecamatan) on Taliabu Island (and its offshore islets) were split off from the Sula Islands Regency to create a separate Taliabu Island Regency (Kabupaten Pulau Taliabu); an eighth district (Tabona) was subsequently created. The districts are tabulated below with their areas and their populations at the 2010 Census and the 2020 Census. The table also includes the locations of the district administrative centres, and the number of villages (rural desa and urban kelurahan) in each district.

Note: (a) the 2010 population of the new Tabona District is included in the figure for Taliabu Timur Selatan District, from which it was later cut out.

Climate
Bobong, the seat of the regency has a tropical rainforest climate (Af) with moderate rainfall in September and October and heavy rainfall in the remaining months.

References

External links 

 

Regencies of North Maluku